Wind power is one of the main renewable energy sources in the world. In Australia alone wind power contributed 10% of Australia's total electricity supply in 2020, and made up to 37.5% of its renewable energy supply. Wind resource testing conditions in Australia are optimum, as abundant wind resources are located close to residential areas in the southern parts of the country and on the slopes of the Great Dividing Range in the east.

As of the end of 2020, there was 7,376 megawatts (MW) of installed wind power capacity contributing 9.9% of generation to the electricity sector in Australia, and a further 4,021 MW of capacity was committed under construction.

Wind resources

The excellent wind resources in Australia provide a major opportunity for the country to grow its renewable energy sector. The southern coastline lies in the roaring forties and many sites have average wind speeds above 8 or even 9m/s at turbine hub height. The southwest portion of Western Australia, south of South Australia, western Victoria, the north of Tasmania as well as elevated areas of New South Wales and Queensland have good wind resources.

During the 1980s and 1990s, several states did systematic monitoring of wind speed. The results are available to the public. Most of these locations are situated close to Australia's main population centres making wind power a convenient resource for electricity generation.

Australian wind farms produce average capacity factors of 30–35%, making wind an attractive option. South Australia's large share (along with nearby Victoria) means most of Australia's wind power occurs around the same time. The correlation between South Australia and New South Wales (NSW) is 0.34, whereas the correlation between South Australia and Tasmania is 0.10.

Wind farms

As of October 2022 there were 94 operational wind farms in Australia, totalling 9,234 MW in capacity.

The largest wind farm is Coopers Gap Wind Farm in Queensland, which began generating to the grid in June 2019, with a capacity of 453 MW. As of December 2019, 50 of the Coopers Gap Wind Farm's 123 turbines were operational.

By generating capacity, the ten largest wind farms in Australia are:

Australia's first commercial wind farm, Salmon Beach Wind Farm near Esperance in Western Australia operated for 15 years from 1987, but was decommissioned due to urban encroachment; it has been replaced by Ten Mile Lagoon Wind Farm and Nine Mile Beach Wind Farm.

Wind power by state

A full listing of all the wind farms in Australia, can be found in List of wind farms in Australia. Relevant state articles are:
New South Wales wind power
Queensland wind farms
South Australia wind power
Tasmania wind farms
Victoria wind farms
Western Australia wind farms

Installed capacity by state

The following figures are based on capacity and generation as at the end of 2020. Proposed figures are updated to December 2020.

Note that figures may not agree with aggregate figures previously stated, due to different data sources and reporting dates contained within them.

South Australia provided 29.2% of Australia's wind power in 2019, accounting for 41% of the state's electricity needs in 2019. By the end of 2011 wind power in South Australia reached 26% of the State's electricity generation, edging out coal-fired power for the first time. At that stage South Australia, with only 7.2% of Australia's population, had 54% of Australia's installed wind capacity.

Victoria also has a substantial system, which provided 27.8% of Australia's wind power in 2019. In August 2015, the Victorian government announced financial backing for new wind farms as part of a push to encourage renewable energy in the state, which was expected to bring forward the building of a modest 100 MW of new wind energy in the state, worth $200 million in investment. The government expected that there were about 2400 MW worth of Victorian projects that had been approved but were yet to be built.

Installed capacity (nameplate) is the theoretical maximum capacity of the engineered design in perfect operating conditions. The accepted AEMO rating is the capacity factor rating which amounts to 30 to 35 per cent of installed/nameplate capacity. And then depending on wind turbine location there is a loss of energy in the feeder transmission line (depending on length) leading to the main electricity grid.

Competitiveness of wind power

Making comparisons between wind and other sources of energy can be difficult because of the cost profiles associated with wind developments. The vast majority of the costs associated with wind developments are upfront capital costs. The operating costs are relatively low but there are maintenance costs including replacement of various components subject to wear, with each additional unit of wind power costing very little to produce. By comparison, conventional gas and coal developments have large capital costs, as well as significant operating costs. Conventional coal and gas fired power stations have more than double the accountable working life compared to wind turbines, and properly maintained could continue to be operated for three times the wind turbine life or longer. The difference in cost profiles creates difficulties when trying to compare the cost of alternative energy sources.

Despite these complexities, most of the data indicate that wind energy is one of the most cost efficient sources of renewable energy but approximately two times the cost of coal generated power in 2006. When the costs associated with pollution are factored in it was competitive with coal- and gas-fired power stations even then. By 2014, wind had the lowest levelised cost of energy (LCOE) of any power source in Australia.

A 2012 study by SKM on the economic benefits of wind farms in Australia found that, for every 50 MW in capacity, a wind farm delivered the following benefits:
 direct employment of up to 48 construction workers, with each worker spending approximately $25,000 in the local area in shops, restaurants, hotels and other services – a total of up to $1.2 million
 direct employment of around five staff – a total annual input of $125,000 spent in the local economy
 indirect employment during the construction phase of approximately 160 people locally, 504 state jobs and 795 nationwide jobs
 up to $250,000 per year for farmers in land rental income and $80,000 on community projects each year.

Environmental impact

Australia is the fifth highest per capita emitter of greenhouse gases with 25.8 tonne CO2-e per person annually, ranking first of the industrialised countries, and ranks sixteenth of all countries in total country emissions with 495 Mt CO2-e per annum. It is one of the major exporters of coal, the burning of which releases CO2 into the atmosphere. It is also one of the countries most at risk from climate change according to the Stern report. This is partially because of the size of its agriculture sector and long coastline.

A wind farm, when installed on agricultural land, has one of the lowest environmental impacts of all energy sources:

 It occupies less land area per kilowatt-hour (kWh) of electricity generated than any other energy conversion system, apart from rooftop solar energy, and is compatible with grazing and crops.
 It generates the energy used in its construction in just 3 months of operation, yet its operational lifetime is 20–25 years.
 Greenhouse gas emissions and air pollution produced by its construction are small and declining. There is very little emission or pollution produced by its operation.
 In substituting for base-load (mostly coal power) in mainland Australia, wind power produces a net decrease in greenhouse gas emissions and air pollution.
 Modern wind turbines are almost silent and rotate so slowly (in terms of revolutions per minute) that they are rarely a hazard to birds.

Landscape and heritage issues may be a significant issue for certain wind farms. However, these are minimal when compared with the Environmental effects of coal. However, when appropriate planning procedures are followed, the heritage and landscape risks should be minimal. Some people may still object to wind farms, perhaps on the grounds of aesthetics, but their concerns should be weighed against the need to address the threats posed by climate change and the opinions of the broader community.

Overseas experience has shown that community consultation and direct involvement of the general public in wind farm projects has helped to increase community approval. Some wind farms become tourist attractions.

The Garnaut Climate Change Review, the Carbon Pollution Reduction Scheme and the Mandatory Renewable energy Target announced by the Australian Government involve a reduction in Australian greenhouse gas emissions. Australia is the highest emitter of greenhouse gases per capita in the developed world and wind power is well placed to grow and deliver greenhouse gas emission cuts on a cost competitive basis. A typical 50-megawatt (MW) wind farm in Australia can reduce greenhouse gas emissions by between 65,000 and 115,000 tonnes a year.

Based on the 2010 figures for electricity production of 5 TWh nationally, it is estimated that wind power saved Australia 5,100,000 tonnes of CO2 emissions in that year. In relative terms, that is calculated to be the equivalent of removing 1,133,000 cars from the nation's roads.

Politics of wind power
From 2001 to early 2006, the main driving force for the establishment of wind farms in Australia was the Government's Mandatory Renewable Energy Target (MRET). However, by mid-2006, sufficient renewable energy had been installed or was under construction to meet the small MRET target for 2010. Also, in 2006, several Federal Government Ministers spoke out against a number of wind farm proposals.

Mark Diesendorf has suggested that the Australian Government has tried to stop the development of wind power, the lowest-cost, new, renewable electricity source, until such time as coal-fired power stations with CO2 capture and sequestration and possibly nuclear power stations were available. However, "clean coal" technologies may not be commercially available for at least 20 years. Furthermore, to bring down the high cost of nuclear power to a level where it could compete with wind power would require a new generation of nuclear power stations that is still on the drawing board, which could take at least 15 years.

In November 2007 when the Rudd (Labor) government was elected in Australia, it ratified Australia's commitment to the Kyoto Protocol, promised a target of 20% renewable power by 2020 and to do more to reduce Australia's greenhouse gas emissions. As a result, several new wind power projects were proposed in anticipation of an expanded MRET.

Major wind power companies

AGL Energy
AGL operates some of the largest wind farms in the Southern Hemisphere. 
 Macarthur Wind Farm, 140 wind turbines, 420 MW
 Hallett Wind Farm, 166 wind turbines, 351 MW
 Wattle Point Wind Farm, 55 wind turbines, 91 MW
 Oaklands Hill Wind Farm, 32 wind turbines, 63 MW
 Silverton Wind Farm, 58 wind turbines, 200 MW
 Coopers Gap Wind Farm, 123 wind turbines, 453 MW

Meridian Energy
Meridian Energy is a New Zealand state-owned enterprise and New Zealand's largest electricity generator. It specialises in renewable energy, namely hydroelectricity and windpower, and has 2353 MW of hydroelectric generation and 357 MW of wind generation in New Zealand. It has in recent years expanded into Australia, and its Australian operations are currently focused on windpower. Projects completed or currently being developed include:
 Mount Mercer Wind Farm, 64 wind turbines, 131 MW
 Mount Millar Wind Farm, 35 wind turbines, 70 MW

Goldwind Australia
Established in 2009, Goldwind Australia offers wind power solutions, including investment, construction, and operational and maintenance services. Some are Permanent magnet Direct-Drive (PMDD) turbines. Major projects include:
 Gullen Range Wind Farm, with mix of 1.5MW and 2.5MW of total 73 wind turbines, total capacity 165.5MW
 White Rock Wind Farm, 70 wind turbines of total 175MW capacity. Stage 2 coming soon
 Cattle Hill Wind Farm, 48 wind turbines of 3MW capacity each, total capacity 144 MW
 Moorabool Wind Farm and Stockyard Hill Wind Farm are under construction projects which close to commission within few years

Pacific Hydro
Pacific Hydro is an Australian company that specialises in electricity generation using renewable energy. Its focus is on hydroelectricity and windpower. Wind power stations owned by Pacific Hydro include:
 Codrington Wind Farm
 Challicum Hills Wind Farm
 Portland Wind Project

Hydro Tasmania 
Hydro Tasmania is based in Tasmania and has three wind farms operating in Australia: Woolnorth Wind Farm in northwest Tasmania, Musselroe Wind Farm in the northeast of Tasmania and Cathedral Rocks Wind Farm in South Australia.

Suzlon
Suzlon Energy Australia Pty. Ltd. (SEA), is based in Melbourne, and is a subsidiary of Suzlon Energy, an Indian multinational based in Pune, India. Suzlon will install 45 units of its S88 – 2.1-megawatt wind turbines for AGL at the Hallett Wind Farm to be located on the Brown Hill Range, which is situated approximately 220 kilometres north of Adelaide.

Tilt Renewables (formally TrustPower)
Tilt Renewables (owned by PowAR and formally part of TrustPower) is an Australian-based renewable electricity generator. It operates a number of wind farms in Australia, including the Snowtown Wind Farm in South Australia and the Dundonnell Wind Farm in Victoria.

Wind Prospect
Wind Prospect undertakes all aspects of wind energy development, including design, construction, operation and commercial services, with offices in the UK, Ireland, Canada, Australia, New Zealand and China. With over 18 years of successful development within the industry, the Wind Prospect Group has been involved in over 2,500 MW of approved wind farms, including onshore and offshore projects, in terms of development, construction, operations and commercial services, and has a further 4000 MW in the early phase of development. The company's civil, electrical and mechanical engineers have been involved in the commissioning of over 50 wind farms around the world.

Wind Prospect's development offices in Australia are in Adelaide, Newcastle, Brisbane and Melbourne. Wind Prospect Pty Ltd (WPPL) is the most successful developer in Australia, having achieved planning approval for 10 wind farms totalling over 860 MW, of which 565 MW is operating or under construction. Two recent successes in South Australia are the North Brown Hill Wind Farm (132.3 MW) and The Bluff Range Wind Farm (52.1 MW), both approximately 270 km north east of Adelaide, which are Wind Prospect's sixth and seventh wind farm developments respectively to progress to construction in South Australia. More projects in this region have received planning approval and are expected to proceed to construction.

Windlab
Windlab Systems is an Australian company with operations in the US, Canada and South Africa. It was established in 2003 as a CSIRO spin-off. The company uses self developed technologies, Windscape which is based on CSIRO's atmospheric modelling technology and advanced wind monitoring tools, to undertake a program of site identification, site validation and wind farm development. Approximately 1,500 MW of projects in Australia have used Windlab intellectual property for site identification purposes. The company co-developed the Oakland's Hill (67 MW) wind farm and the Collgar Wind Farm (206 MW). With incentives from the ACT large scale feed-in tariff, Windlab is building the Coonooer Bridge Wind Farm, located North West of Bendigo, Victoria. This project is jointly owned by Windlab Limited, Eurus Energy and landholders neighbouring the project and has 6 turbines generating up to 19.4 MW. From 2017, Windlab will begin building the Kiata Wind Farm, a 30MW wind energy project located 50 km North West of Horsham, Victoria. Windlab is also developing the Kennedy energy park in North Queensland near Townsville, in two stages: Up to 40 – 50 MW of wind and 40 – 50 MW of solar in the first phase and up to 600 MW of wind and 600 MW of solar in the second phase. Windlab has since become a full wind farm developer and takes projects to the point of construction.

Infigen Energy
Infigen Energy is a developer, owner and operator of renewable generation, specifically wind and solar power within Australia and the United States. Its head office is in Sydney. The company has developed several wind farms particularly in South Australia and New South Wales with further proposed wind farms in Western Australia and Victoria.

See also
 Energy policy of Australia
 Australian Renewable Energy Agency
 List of large wind farms
 Renewable energy in Australia (including Hydropower in Australia)
 Solar power in Australia
 Geothermal power in Australia
 Biofuel in Australia
 Renewable energy debate

References

External links

  Australian wind energy production since 14 May 2008 (data from AEMO)
 List of useful links about renewable energy in Australia
 Renewable Energy Atlas of Australia
 Why Australia needs wind power by Mark Diesendorf
 SA Electricity Industry Supply Planning Council 2005 Wind Study
 Sustainability Victoria Wind Energy: The Myths and the Facts
 The base-load fallacy by Mark Diesendorf
 Integrating wind energy in the Australian National Electricity Market
 Australian wind energy projects